This national electoral calendar for 2022 lists the national/federal elections held in 2022 in all sovereign states and their dependent territories. By-elections are excluded, though national referendums are included.

January
 16 January: Serbia, Constitutional Referendum
 19 January: Barbados, House of Assembly
 23 January: Northern Cyprus, Parliament
 30 January: Portugal, Parliament

February
 6 February: Costa Rica, President (1st round) and Parliament
 13 February: Switzerland, Referendums
 27 February: Belarus, Constitutional Referendum

March
 9 March: South Korea, President
 12 March:
 Abkhazia, Parliament (1st round)
 Turkmenistan, President
 13 March: Colombia, House of Representatives and Senate
 19 March: East Timor, President (1st round)
 26 March:
 Abkhazia, Parliament (2nd round)
 Malta, Parliament
 27 March: Uruguay, Referendum

April
 3 April:
 Costa Rica, President (2nd round)
 Hungary, Parliament and Referendum
 Serbia, President and Parliament
 9 April: The Gambia, Parliament
 10 April:
 France, President (1st round)
 Mexico, Referendum
 South Ossetia, President (1st round)
 19 April: East Timor, President (2nd round)
 24 April:
 France, President (2nd round)
 Slovenia, Parliament

May
 8 May: South Ossetia, President (2nd round)
 9 May: Philippines, President, House of Representatives and Senate
 15 May:
 Lebanon, Parliament
 Switzerland, Referendums
 21 May: Australia, House of Representatives and Senate
 29 May: Colombia, President (1st round)

June
 1 June: Denmark, Referendum
 5 June: Kazakhstan, Constitutional Referendum
 12 June:
 France, National Assembly (1st round)
 Italy, Referendums
 19 June:
 Colombia, President (2nd round)
 France, National Assembly (2nd round)
 22 June: Jersey, Parliament
 23 June: Grenada, House of Representatives
 26 June: Liechtenstein, Referendum

July
 4–22 July: Papua New Guinea, Parliament
 10 July:
 Republic of the Congo, Parliament (1st round)
 Japan, House of Councillors
 25 July: Tunisia, Constitutional Referendum
 31 July:
 Republic of the Congo, Parliament (2nd round)
 Senegal, Parliament

August
 1 August: Cook Islands, Parliament and Referendum
 5 August: Saint Kitts and Nevis, Parliament
 9 August: Kenya, President, National Assembly and Senate
 24 August: Angola, President and Parliament

September
 4 September: Chile, Constitutional Referendum
 11 September: Sweden, Parliament
 18 September: Liechtenstein, Referendum
 23–24 September: Czech Republic, Senate
 23–27 September:
 Luhansk People's Republic and Donetsk People's Republic, Russian annexation referendums
 Russian Armed Forces-occupied Kherson and Zaporizhzhia Oblasts, Russian annexation referendums
 24 September: Nauru, Parliament
 25 September:
 Cuba, Referendum
 Italy, Chamber of Deputies and Senate
 São Tomé and Príncipe, Parliament
 Switzerland, Referendums
 29 September: Kuwait, Parliament

October
 1 October: Latvia, Parliament
 2 October:
 Bosnia and Herzegovina, Presidency and House of Representatives
 Brazil, President (1st round), Chamber of Deputies and Senate
 Bulgaria, Parliament
 7 October: Lesotho, National Assembly
 9 October: Austria, President
 13 October: Vanuatu, Parliament
 23 October: Slovenia, President (1st round)
 30 October: Brazil, President (2nd round)

November
 1 November:
 Denmark, Parliament
 Israel, Parliament
 8 November: United States, House of Representatives and Senate
 12 November: Bahrain, Parliament
 13 November: Slovenia, President (2nd round)
 19 November: Malaysia, House of Representatives
 20 November:
 Equatorial Guinea, President, Chamber of Deputies and Senate
 Kazakhstan, President
 Nepal, House of Representatives
 26 November: Taiwan, Constitutional Referendum
 27 November: Slovenia, Referendum

December
 6 December: Dominica, Parliament
 8 December: Faroe Islands, Legislature
 14 December: Fiji, Parliament
 17 December: Tunisia, Parliament (first round)

Indirect elections
The following indirect elections of heads of state and the upper houses of bicameral legislatures are scheduled to take place through votes in elected lower houses, unicameral legislatures, or electoral colleges:

 1 November 202113 April 2022: Somalia, House of the People
 24–29 January: Italy, President
 26 January: Nepal, National Assembly
 5 February: Algeria, Council of the Nation
 13 February: Germany, President
 3 March: Armenia, President
 10 March: Hungary, President
 8 May: Hong Kong, Chief Executive
 15 May: Somalia, President
 16 May – 4 June: Albania, President
 18 July: India, President
 20 July: Sri Lanka, President
 21–23 July: Vanuatu, President
 23 August: Samoa, Head of State
 28 September: Nauru, President
 Since 29 September: Lebanon, President
 2 October: Bosnia and Herzegovina, House of Peoples
 13 October: Iraq, President
 7 December: Switzerland, Federal Council

See also
 List of elections in 2022

External links
 IFES Election Guide – Elections
 National Democratic Institute – Electoral Calendar

References

National
National
Political timelines of the 2020s by year
National